Parvibaculum  is a genus of bacteria from the family of Rhodobiaceae.

References

Further reading 
 
 

Hyphomicrobiales
Bacteria genera